Static Migration is a collaboration album between the bands Tribes of Neurot and Walking Timebombs, released on January 27, 1998 through Release Entertainment.

Reception

Allmusic reviewer Tom Schulte gave the record 3 out of 5 stars, describing it as "a coherent vision of inner space travel" and a "fully textured and richly painted canvas of basic themes."

Track listing

Personnel

Tribes of Neurot & Walking Time Bombs
Ajax
Billy Anderson
Scott Ayers – mixing
Danny
Dave Edwardson
Frank Garymartin
Scott Kelly
Noah Landis
Pete Inc.
Jason Roeder
Steve Von Till

Additional musicians and production
Matthew F. Jacobson – executive production
Dave Shirk – mastering
Bill Yurkiewicz – executive production, mastering

References

1998 albums
Instrumental albums
Collaborative albums
Tribes of Neurot albums
Walking Timebombs albums